, or the , is an archipelago in the Tsushima Strait, which is administered as the city of Iki in Nagasaki Prefecture, Japan. Only four (4) of the twenty-three (23) named islands are permanently inhabited. Together with the neighboring islands of Tsushima, they are collectively within the borders of the Iki–Tsushima Quasi-National Park.

Geology
The Iki Islands are volcanic in origin: they are the exposed and eroded basaltic summit of a massive Quaternary stratovolcano last active over 400,000 years ago.

The average height of the land surface is 100 meters above sea level.

History
The Iki Islands have been inhabited since the Japanese Paleolithic era, and numerous artifacts from the Jōmon, Yayoi and Kofun periods have been found by archaeologists, indicating continuous human occupation and activity. In the Chinese Wèizhì Wōrén chuán (Japanese 魏志倭人伝, Gishi Wajinden), part of the Records of the Three Kingdoms dating from the third century, mention is made of a country called “Iki”, (一支国, Iki-koku), located on an archipelago east of the Korean Peninsula. Archaeologists have tentatively identified this with the large Yayoi period settlement of Harunotsuji, one of the largest to have been discovered in Japan, where artifacts uncovered indicate a close contact with the Japanese islands and the Asian mainland.

The islands were organized as Iki Province under the Ritsuryō reforms in the latter half of the seventh century, and the name Iki-no-kuni appears on wooden markers found in the imperial capital of Nara.

During the Heian period, the island was attacked by Jurchen pirates in the Toi invasion of 1019. Afterwards, the islands came under the rule of the Matsura clan, who developed trade and commercial relations between Goryeo in Korea, Tsushima, Iki and Kyushu. However, the islands were again devastated by the Kamakura period Mongol invasions of Japan in 1274 and 1281 during which time many of its inhabitants were slaughtered. Throughout the Muromachi period, the islands were a main base for the Japanese Wokou pirates, who plundered coastal settlements in Korea and China. Following the establishment of the Tokugawa shogunate in the Edo period, the islands came under the rule of Hirado Domain.

Following the Meiji Restoration, the islands became part of "Hirado Prefecture" from 1871, which then became part of Nagasaki Prefecture.

The islands were fortified with numerous coastal artillery batteries during World War II, but did not experience any combat. Remains of these fortifications can be found on the island of Wakamiyajima, north of the main Iki Island. On November 18, 1948, Lt. William Downham, from the USAF 36th Fighter Group stationed at Ashiya Air Field, experienced engine failure in his North American P-51 Mustang while patrolling the Korea Strait between Japan and the Korean Peninsula. He successfully parachuted onto Iki Island.

In the 1960s and 1970s, in particularly the town of Iki, the islanders were notorious for overfishing, but blamed declining catches on the local species of whales and dolphins. In 1977, the local fishermen invited television companies to film the mass slaughter of dolphins. In response, activists heavily condemned the fishermen's acts of killing the dolphins. In view of the already endangered Japanese amberjack, the local town government banned large-scale, commercial fishing of Japanese amberjack after 1982.

Climate

Transportation
Iki Island has ferry terminals in Ashibe, Ishida and Gōnoura, which connect Iki to mainland Japan such as Fukuoka and Kitakyushu. Located on the east coast Iki Airport connects the island to Nagasaki Airport in Nagasaki. The Japan National Route 382 connects the hamlets of the island together, and the bus company "Iki-kōtsu" provides for public transport.

Islands

References
National Geospatial Intelligence Agency (NGIA). Prostar Sailing Directions 2005 Japan Enroute. Prostar Publications (2005).

Notes

Archipelagoes of Japan
Islands of Nagasaki Prefecture
Landforms of Nagasaki Prefecture
Pleistocene stratovolcanoes
Stratovolcanoes of Japan
Archipelagoes of the Pacific Ocean